Kim Man-chol (김만철, born 11 February 1972) is a North Korean sport shooter who competed in the 1992 Summer Olympics and in the 1996 Summer Olympics.

References

1972 births
Living people
North Korean male sport shooters
Running target shooters
Olympic shooters of North Korea
Shooters at the 1992 Summer Olympics
Shooters at the 1996 Summer Olympics
Shooters at the 1990 Asian Games
Asian Games medalists in shooting
Asian Games silver medalists for North Korea
Medalists at the 1990 Asian Games
20th-century North Korean people